Sweetheart of the Gods is a 1960 West German biographical film directed by Gottfried Reinhardt and starring Ruth Leuwerik, Peter van Eyck, and Harry Meyen. The film portrays the life of Renate Müller, a German film actress who died in 1937 in mysterious circumstances. A variety of rumours about Müller's death had developed, but the filmmakers chose to portray it as suicide following Nazi pressure over her relationship with a Jewish diplomat. Following legal objections from Müller's family, the ending was toned down to make her final fate more vague.

Leuwerik recreates scenes and songs from several of Müller's films. However their star personae were very different, with Müller famous as a girl-next-door while Leuwerik played the role in her more usual refined fashion. Although set in the 1930s, stylistically the film often resembles the late 1950s. Willy Fritsch, a German star of the 1930s who had acted alongside Müller in two films, appears in a small role.

It was shot at the Spandau Studios in Berlin with sets designed by the art directors Paul Markwitz and Fritz Maurischat.
The film was moderately successful commercially on its release in West Germany.

Cast

References

Bibliography

External links 
 

1960 films
1960s musical drama films
1960s biographical drama films
German biographical drama films
German musical drama films
West German films
1960s German-language films
Films directed by Gottfried Reinhardt
Films set in the 1930s
Films about Nazi Germany
Films set in Berlin
Films about filmmaking
Biographical films about actors
Bavaria Film films
1960 drama films
Films shot at Spandau Studios
1960s German films